Amedee J. Van Beuren (born Amedee Vignot; July 10, 1879 – November 12, 1938) was the producer of  Frank Buck's first three films, as well as many cartoons and short films.

Early years
Van Beuren was born in New York, the son of Alfred Vignot, who died in 1894, and Marietta Ferguson. Subsequently, Marietta married Alfred van Beuren on January 13, 1898, when Amadee was in his 9th year, and he took on his stepfather's surname. Alfred van Beuren was head of the van Beuren advertising company, which became a part of the General Outdoor Advertising Company. Amedee was educated at public and private schools and a business college. He worked in the livery business, groceries, and then as a salesman.

Van Beuren Productions
One of Amedee van Beuren's earliest and most successful projects was a series of cartoons produced by his Van Beuren Studios, Aesop's Film Fables. Later movies produced included the Frank Buck features Bring 'Em Back Alive (1932), Wild Cargo (1934), and Fang and Claw (1935). Van Beuren Studios also issued more than two hundred animated shorts. van Beuren was president of the Colorado Springs Theatre Corporation and the Kernab Corporation. He was a life member of the Society of The Friendly Sons of St. Patrick.

Lowell's lawsuit against Beuren

A 1935 lawsuit by Joan Lowell against  Amedee van Beuren and van Beuren Studios demanded an accounting of the profits from the film Adventure Girl. Lowell wrote and starred in this filmed version of her book, Cradle of the Deep. van Beuren promptly made a counter-claim for $300,000 damages alleged to have been sustained because of Lowell's inexpert performance in the picture. Lowell alleged that she had not received 15 per cent of the earnings guaranteed her. van Beuren replied that they lost $300,000 on the picture. In making the counter-claim for that sum van Beuren asserted that Lowell "carelessly, negligently, inefficiently, inexpertly, and improperly acted and performed in the motion picture produced as to seriously impair and damage the reputation, fame, and business capacity of the defendant."

Final years
In July 1938, Van Beuren had a stroke but gradually recovered, although he was confined to his home. He died of a heart attack, age 58, November 12, 1938, at his  country estate, Dreamwold, in Carmel, New York.

References

External links
 

19th-century births
1938 deaths
American film producers
People from New York (state)